Ponta do Ouro (also Ponta d'Ouro) is a town in the extreme south of Mozambique, lying on the Mozambique Channel, south of Maputo and just north of the border with South Africa. 
The name is Portuguese for "tip of gold", referring to a cape at the southern part of the beach.
It is known for its beach, dolphins, offshore diving and deep-sea fishing.

The currency is the metical, but the South African rand and the US dollar are also accepted. Shopping is very limited in Ponta. There is a petrol station, bank, pharmacy, hardware stores, bottle stores and other small shops in town. Fresh bread can be purchased at the local market. Basic food items like vegetables, fruits can be purchased at this market. No luxurious items are available anywhere in Ponta do Ouro. Holiday accommodation is readily available. There are 3 to 4 modern and comfortable resorts in Ponta on the beachfront and surrounding areas. Other resorts date from pre-war and – although quite primitive with limited facilities – are very popular with tourists due to reasonable pricing and excellent location on the beachfront. It is commonly referred to as 'Ponta' by visiting South Africans.

Ponta do Ouro is about 15 km away from the South African border and about 130 km south of Maputo.  With the new road connecting Maputo to Ponta do Ouro, the travel lasts about one hour.

External links

 

Populated places in Maputo Province